Archibald Buchanan may refer to:

 Archibald Buchanan (RAF officer) (1892–?), American World War I flying ace
 Archibald Berdmore Buchanan (1823–1883), politician in Queensland, Australia
 Archibald C. Buchanan (1890–1979), Justice of the Supreme Court of Appeals of Virginia